The 1989–90 Ice hockey Bundesliga season was the 32nd season of the Ice hockey Bundesliga, the top level of ice hockey in Germany. 10 teams participated in the league, and Düsseldorfer EG won the championship.

First round

Relegation round

Playoffs

Quarterfinals

Semifinals

3rd place

Final

References

External links
Season on hockeyarchives.info

Eishockey-Bundesliga seasons
Ger
Bundesliga
1989 in East German sport
1990 in East German sport